Southern Han (917–971), officially Han, originally Yue, was a dynastic state of China and one of the Ten Kingdoms that existed during the Five Dynasties and Ten Kingdoms period. It was located on China's southern coast, controlling modern Guangdong and Guangxi. The dynasty greatly expanded its capital Xingwang Fu (present-day Guangzhou). It attempted but failed to annex the autonomous polity of Jinghai, which was controlled by the Vietnamese.

Founding of the Southern Han 
Liu Yin was named regional governor and military officer by the Tang court in 905.  Though the Tang fell two years later, Liu did not declare himself the founder of a new kingdom as other southern leaders had done.  He merely inherited the title of Prince of Nanping in 909.

It was not until Liu Yin's death in 917 that his brother, Liu Yan, declared the founding of a new kingdom, which he initially called "Yue"; he changed the name to Han in 918. This was because his surname Liu was the imperial surname of the Han dynasty and he claimed to be a descendant of that famous dynasty. The kingdom is often referred to as the Southern Han Dynasty throughout China's history. It attempted but failed to annex the independent polity of Jinghai which was controlled by the Vietnamese.

Territorial extent
With its capital at present-day Guangzhou, the domains of the kingdom spread along the coastal regions of present-day Guangdong, Guangxi and the island of Hainan. It had borders with the kingdoms of Min, Chu and the Southern Tang as well as the non-Chinese kingdoms of Dali. The Southern Tang occupied all of the northern boundary of the Southern Han after Min and Chu were conquered by the Southern Tang in 945 and 951 respectively.

War with the Vietnamese

During the late 9th century as the Tang dynasty weakened, local Vietnamese lords began taking control of its domain in Jinghai (northern Vietnam). Southern Han campaigned twice against the Vietnamese in 931 and 938 in an attempt to add these Vietnamese territories to their realm, but failed both.

Fall of the Southern Han
The Five Dynasties ended in 960 when the Song dynasty was founded to replace the Later Zhou.  From that point, the new Song rulers set themselves about to continue the reunification process set in motion by the Later Zhou.  Through the 960s and 970s, the Song increased its influence in the south until finally it was able to force the Southern Han dynasty to submit to its rule in 971.

Rulers

Rulers family tree

References

Citations

Sources 

Schafer, Edward H. "The History of the Empire of Southern Han: According to Chapter 65 of the Wu-tai-shih of Ou-yang Hsiu", Zinbun-kagaku-kenkyusyo (ed.), Silver Jubilee Volume of the Zinbun-kagaku-kenkyusyo. Kyoto, Kyoto University, 1954.

 
 

 
Five Dynasties and Ten Kingdoms
Former countries in Chinese history
917 establishments
10th-century establishments in China
971 disestablishments
970s disestablishments
10th-century disestablishments in China
States and territories established in the 910s
States and territories disestablished in the 970s
Former kingdoms